Sadio Sankharé (born 9 July 1981 in Paris, France) is a French football defender who played a total of 35 matches in Ligue 2 for Grenoble Foot 38 and Nîmes Olympique. He started his career with ES Thaon in the Championnat de France amateur 2 before joining Championnat National side US Raon-l'Étape in 2004. Sankharé spent one season with the club, making 31 league appearances, before moving to Grenoble, where he played 15 Ligue 2 matches during a two-year spell. In 2007, he returned to the National with Nîmes and was an integral part of the squad that won promotion in 2007–08. 

After making 20 Ligue 2 appearances the following campaign, Sankharé joined CFA2 club SO Chambéry Foot and played three matches during the 2009–10 season. He then spent a year with Paris FC, before joining Chamois Niortais in the summer of 2011.

References

French footballers
French people of Malian descent
1981 births
Footballers from Paris
Living people
Nîmes Olympique players
Chamois Niortais F.C. players
US Raon-l'Étape players
Association football defenders
Chambéry SF players